The MBI Sports Complex is a multi-use sports complex in Ipoh, Perak, Malaysia. The Perak Stadium is currently used mostly for football matches. The stadium has a capacity of 30,000 people. It was built in 1997.

See also
 Sport in Malaysia

References

Football venues in Malaysia
Athletics (track and field) venues in Malaysia
Multi-purpose stadiums in Malaysia
Buildings and structures in Ipoh
Sports venues in Perak